Keith Bezanson (born May 12, 1941) is a Canadian diplomat and international public servant.

Formerly Director of the Institute of Development Studies (IDS) (1997–2004) and Canada's International Development Research Centre (IDRC) (1991–1997), Dr Bezanson's career has included a number of development and diplomatic roles. He has held senior posts with the Inter-American Development Bank and the Canadian International Development Agency (CIDA), and between 1985 and 1988 was Canadian Ambassador to Peru and Bolivia. Prior to that he was a lecturer and researcher in Ghana, and a teacher in Nigeria.

Dr. Bezanson was born in Kingston, Ontario. He is a graduate of Carleton University, Ottawa, Ontario, Canada, and of Stanford University, California. He is the author of numerous publications on international development.

External links 
 International Institute for Sustainable Development
 International Development Research Centre
 Carleton University Alumni Association
 Foreign Affairs and International Trade Canada Complete List of Posts
 

Carleton University alumni
Stanford University alumni
People from Kingston, Ontario
Living people
Ambassadors of Canada to Bolivia
Ambassadors of Canada to Peru
Canadian expatriates in Nigeria
Canadian expatriates in Ghana
1941 births